FC Drottninghög is a Swedish football club located in Helsingborg.

Background
The club was founded 2014. FC Drottninghög currently plays in Division 7 Skåne Nordvästra. They play their home matches at the Norvalla IP in Helsingborg.

Football clubs in Skåne County